Anne-Sofie Østvedt, (later married Strømnæs), (2 January 1920 – 16 November 2009) was one of the leaders of the Norwegian intelligence organisation XU.

She started her resistance work by publishing underground newspapers, and in December 1941 XU recruited her. The Gestapo began hunting her in the Autumn of 1942 and she had to live undercover for the rest of the war.

Despite her young age, she was vital to the organisation and was second in command, but her identity was a strict secret and almost none within the XU knew her. Since one of her cover names was "Aslak" - a male name in Norway - it was a huge surprise for many to meet her after the war was over.

After the end of the war she received a scholarship and from the summer of 1945 she studied chemistry at the University of California, Berkeley, graduated with a master's degree and then returned to Norway in 1951. Studying with her in California was the leader of XU, Øistein Strømnæs, whom she married.

References

Further reading

1920 births
2009 deaths
Female resistance members of World War II
Norwegian resistance members
XU
Norwegian women in World War II
University of California, Berkeley alumni
Norwegian expatriates in the United States